The Sanremo Music Festival 1999 was the 49th annual Sanremo Music Festival, held at the Teatro Ariston in Sanremo, province of Imperia, between 23 and 27 February 1999 and broadcast on Rai 1.

The show was presented by Fabio Fazio (who also  served as the artistic director), supported by Laetitia Casta and Renato Dulbecco.

The quality jury consisted of Ennio Morricone (who served as president), Umberto Bindi, Toquinho, Carlo Verdone, José Carreras, Maurizio De Angelis, Enrico Brizzi, Amadeus and Dario Salvatori.

The winner of the Big Artists section was Anna Oxa with the song "Senza pietà", and Daniele Silvestri won the Mia Martini Critics Award with the song "Aria".

Alex Britti won the "Newcomers" section with the song "Oggi sono io".

In addition to musical guests, the guests of  this edition also included Mikhail Gorbachev, Neil Armstrong and Buzz Aldrin, Michael Moore, Leslie Nielsen, Gustav Thöni, Silvan, Darlene Conley, Roberto Mancini, Alessandro Del Piero, Carla Fracci, Pierluigi Collina and Teo Teocoli.

In this edition it was introduced the "Premio Città di Sanremo", a career award won by Ornella Vanoni.

After every night Rai 1 broadcast DopoFestival, a talk show about the Festival with the participation of singers and journalists. It was hosted by Orietta Berti and Teo Teocoli, with the regular participation of Fabio Fazio.

Participants and results

Big Artists

Newcomers

Musical guests

References 

Sanremo Music Festival by year
1999 in Italian music 
1999 in Italian television 
1999 music festivals